The Scottish index of multiple deprivation (SIMD) is a statistical tool used by local authorities, the Scottish government, the NHS and other government bodies in Scotland to support policy and decision making. It won the Royal Statistical Society's Excellence in Official Statistics Awards in 2017.

The 2016 release, known as SIMD16, was issued in August of that year and replaced the 2012 dataset.

The Scottish index of multiple deprivation measures across seven domains: current income, employment, health, education, skills and training, housing, geographic access and crime. These seven domains are calculated and weighted for 6,976 small areas, called ‘data zones’, with roughly equal population. With the population total at 5.3 million that comes to an average population of 760 people per data zone.

The principle behind the index is to target government action in the areas which need it most.

See also
 Oxford IMD-2000/2004 (ODPM)
 Townsend deprivation index

References

External links
 Scottish Index of Multiple Deprivation on the Scottish Government website
 Deprivation in Scotland 2012, Google Maps overlaid with SIMD12 data by Professor Alasdair Rae of the University of Sheffield
 Official stats, and how to publish them - a post with Taylor Swift, blog post by Dr. Peter Matthews of the University of Stirling

Geodemographic databases
Scottish Government
Poverty in Scotland
Measurements and definitions of poverty
Local government in Scotland
NHS Scotland
Economy of Scotland
Statistical data
Science and technology in Scotland
Crime statistics
Housing in Scotland
Crime in Scotland
Education in Scotland
Health in Scotland
Employment in the United Kingdom
Income in the United Kingdom